Rajathi Rojakili is a 1985 Indian Tamil-language film directed by S. Devarajan, starring Rajesh, Goundamani, Manorama, Senthil, Nalini and Sulakshana, Suresh. Goundamani acted as the main villain.

Plot 
The story begins with the life of Zamindar Velu Mayilu Thevar. The Zamindar's nephew is Soora Thevar, who is frustrated with the Zamindar's good deeds and kind actions and wants to take up all the wealth for himself. Along with his wife and assistant, he poisons Velu Thevar's food, thus leaving Velu's young son Surutaiyan without parental care. Soora Thevar becomes the guardian for Velu Thevar's wealth, until Surutaiyan grows up. Seenu Thevar, who used to work for Velu Thevar starts taking care of Surutaiyan, as he doesn't like Soora Thevar torturing Surutaiyan. Soora Thevar's plans work out and he sends his daughter to a convent, but Surutaiyan remains uneducated. Years later, his daughter now grown up is all educated and smart. Surutaiyan and Seenu Thevar now ask Soora Thevar to return Velu Thevar's wealth back to Surutaiyan as he is also grown up now. But after seeing the crocodile tears shed by Soora Thevar and family, he changes his mind and goes back. Surutaiyan falls in love with Seenu Thevar's daughter and Nalini falls in love with Suresh, her college mate. After a lot of family feuds and quarrels, Soora Thevar, along with his assistant, kills Surutaiyan and dumps his body in a well, making the villagers believe it was suicide. Meanwhile, Seenu Thevar, who realizes that Sulakshana is pregnant with Surutaiyan's child, confronts Soora Thevar in front of the whole village and states that Surutaiyan's child must be born in the ancestral house of his father, but gets insulted by Soora Thevar and sent out. One day, Surutaiyan's ghost returns to torment Soora Thevar, his family and his accomplices. How Surutaiyan's ghost avenges Soora Thevar forms the rest of the story.

Cast 
Rajesh as Surutaiyan
Nalini as Rani
Goundamani as Soora Thevar
Manorama as Kaluvaaiyi
Suresh as Rani's Husband
Vijay Krishnaraj as Seenu Thevar
Sulakshana as Rasaathi
Senthil as Patta Sombu
Anuradha (Special Appearance in the song "Vaazha Pazhuthirukku")
 Kamila Prasad Babu as Childhood Surutaiyan

Production 
The film was predominantly shot in the village KG Patti.

Soundtrack 
The film score and soundtrack were composed by Chandrabose.

Reception
Jayamanmadhan of Kalki wrote that the story has been vividly told in a beautiful village backdrop and concluded that the film felt like having a mixture of sweet and spice. The critic praised Goundamani's acting. Devaraj's direction and Chandrabose's music.

References

Bibliography

External links 
 

1980s Tamil-language films
1985 films
1985 horror films
Films scored by Chandrabose (composer)
Indian horror films